Frederic Louis Norden (22 October 1708 – 22 September 1742) was a  Danish naval captain,  cartographer, and archaeological explorer.
Also known as Frederick, Frederik, Friderick, Ludwig, Ludvig and Lewis,  names used on the publications of his famous Voyage d'Egypte et de Nubie.

Biography
Norden was born in Holstein-Glückstadt. He entered the Royal Danish Naval Academy at Copenhagen in 1722.
He was sent on a study mission abroad in 1732. Norden made a voyage through Egypt all the way down to Sudan in 1737–1738. At the request of King Christian VI of Denmark, he was to enter into a trade agreement with Ethiopia on behalf of Denmark. Norden made abundant notes, observations and drawings of everything around him, including people, pharaonic monuments, architecture, installations and maps. 

On 8 January 1741 he became a Fellow of the Royal Society of London (registered as Frederic Lewis Norden). He died of tuberculosis the following year in Paris. Norden had prepared the publication of his travel notes all of which were published in the posthumous Voyage d'Egypte et de Nubie (Copenhagen, 1755). Carl Marcus Tuscher (1705–1751) from Nuremberg made the drawings into copperplates for the publication.
In 1757 an English edition was published, in 1779 a German edition and in 1795 a French edition.

Works
 Drawings of some ruins and colossal statues at Thebes in Egypt, 1741

Drawing from Voyage d'Egypte et de Nubie

References

Other sources

Additional reading
Buhl, Marie-Louise, et al.: The Danish Naval Officer, Frederik Ludvig Norden,   (Royal Danish Academy of Sciences and Letters: Copenhagen, 1986)

External links
Voyage d'Égypte et de Nubie University of Oslo

1708 births
1742 deaths
18th-century Danish naval officers
People from Schleswig-Holstein
Danish explorers
 Danish cartographers
Danish travel writers
18th-century Danish people
Fellows of the Royal Society